Lenny Massey (born March 23, 1988) is a saxophonist and keyboardist from Pakistan.

Early life and career 
Born in Karachi, Pakistan, Massey has performed with numerous notable artists from Pakistan including Sajjad Ali in Coke Studio Season 10. Massey is widely known for his work in Coke Studio and his rendition of Nusrat Fateh Ali Khan's Wohi Khuda Hai. Lenny is one of the few saxophone players in Pakistan and he is actively participating in several music shows including Coke Studio, Acoustic Station, and more. He has also performed at exclusive monsoon edition of The South Asian Ensemble.

Lenny Massey, with his fellow musician Selwyn Gerald also performed randomly at Karachi Airport. With his band, Lenny Massey also performed at Fashion Week Pakistan in 2021.

Discography

Singles and renditions 

 Destiny
 Wohi Khuda Hai
 Dancing with the stranger

Acoustic Station 

 Lolak - Latif Ali Khan
 Karde Karam - Hamza Akram Qawwal

References 

21st-century Pakistani male musicians
21st-century saxophonists
1988 births
Living people
Musicians from Karachi